Bahram Afzali (1937–1984) was the Commander of the Islamic Republic of Iran Navy from May/June 1980 to 24 April 1983. He was executed for his clandestine membership in the Tudeh Party of Iran in 1984.

Career
Afzali was born in 1937 in the city of Qom. His father was a cleric. He entered the service of the Imperial Iranian Navy in 1957 and was sent to Italy for further education. In 1961, he was graduated from Italian Naval Academy, where he was trained in mechanical engineering and shipbuilding. He later obtained a PhD in boat and submarine architecture in 1970.

Afzali was an engineer and a captain in the Imperial Iranian Navy. After the 1979 revolution, he continued to serve in the Navy and took part in the Iran–Iraq War. Then Iranian president Abolhassan Bani Sadr appointed him as the commander of the Navy in June 1980. He was also special adviser of then speaker of the Iranian parliament, Ali Akbar Hashemi Rafsanjani.

Arrest, trial and death
At the beginning of 1983, Afzali, along with more than a thousand members of the Tudeh Party was arrested by the IRP. The trial carried out in the form of a military tribunal in December 1983, and 32 of them were sentenced to death. Their judge was Hojjat Al Islam Mohammad Reyshahri, who also interrogated Mahdi Hashemi in 1986. The location of the tribunal has been never revealed.

Ten of these Tudeh members were executed. On 25 February 1984, Afzali was executed on charges of espionage for the Soviet Union.

See also 
 List of Iranian commanders in the Iran–Iraq War

References

External links 
 Official website

1937 births
1984 deaths
People from Qom
Commanders of Islamic Republic of Iran Navy
20th-century executions by Iran
Executed spies
Iranian people convicted of spying for the Soviet Union
Tudeh Military Network members
Islamic Republic of Iran Army personnel of the Iran–Iraq War
Imperial Iranian Navy personnel
University of Genoa alumni
Iranian expatriates in Italy
Marine engineers